Emilie Bydwell (born 31 August 1985 in Toronto, Ontario) is a Canadian American rugby union player. 
Bydwell was a 3 time All-American and was also selected as the 2007 Collegiate Player of the Year. Bydwell was named the head coach of the United States women's national rugby sevens team on November 23, 2021.
She made her USA eagles debut against England in August 2008.

Emilie is a lesbian and is married to Michaela Staniford since 2015 as they have a daughter named Olivia “Ollie” Jane Bydwell who was born on July 23, 2018.

References

External links
 

1985 births
Living people
21st-century American women
American female rugby union players
Canadian female rugby union players
Female rugby union players
Lesbian sportswomen
United States women's international rugby union players
American female rugby sevens players